Acebo (Extremaduran: L'Acebu) is a municipality in Cáceres province, Extremadura, Spain. It is located in the northeast of the province, in the Sierra de Gata comarca.

Demographics 
Acebo has had the following population data decade by decade since 1900:

References 

Municipalities in the Province of Cáceres
Articles which contain graphical timelines